Prosperity Now, formerly known as the Corporation for Enterprise Development (CFED), is a national nonprofit based in Washington, DC, dedicated to expanding economic opportunity for low-income families and communities in the United States. CFED uses an approach grounded in community practice, public policy and private markets. CFED publishes research, partners with local practitioners to carry out demonstration projects, and engages in policy advocacy work at the local, state and national levels. The organization works domestically with satellite offices in San Francisco, California, and Durham, North Carolina.

History
CFED was founded in 1979 by Bob Friedman. The organization was initially focused on economic development and microenterprise. It worked to reduce unemployment and expand opportunity by advocating for policies that would make it easier for entrepreneurs to start or expand a small business. In 1988, CFED launched the Development Report Card (DRC) for the States, a broad-based report that used multiple indicators to rate the economies of all 50 states. The DRC was widely used across the field and provided policymakers and businesses a comparative measure to assess each state's business climate. The DRC was retired in 2007 and was replaced with the Assets & Opportunity Scorecard.

CFED was one of the first champions of Individual Development Accounts (IDA) – matched savings accounts that help low-income people save for a particular goal, such as buying a home, paying for post-secondary education, or starting or expanding a small business. In 1997, CFED launched the American Dream Demonstration, which was the first large-scale test of IDAs as a social and economic development tool. After seeing the success of IDAs, Congress passed the Assets for Independence Act (AFIA), providing $125 million over five years to fund IDAs. The AFI Program is administered by the Office of Community Services, within the U.S. Department of Health and Human Services, Administration for Children and Families. There are currently hundreds of IDA programs across the United States. CFED is well known in the field as the expert on Individual Development Accounts, as well as other asset building programs and policies.

Policy influence
 Individual Development Accounts
 CFED is one of the organizations leading efforts to pass the Saver's Credit Expansion and recently launched the Saver's Credit Alliance, a coalition of the corporate sector, nonprofit sector and national organizations who support the expansion. On January 28, 2010 President Barack Obama announced that he plans to include an expansion of the Saver's Credit in his 2011 budget as a component of the agenda of the Middle Class Working Families Task Force, as well as in the State of the Union. The Saver's Credit will increase the net worth and retirement security of as many as 50 million low- to moderate-income working American families and could increase their assets by as much as $44 billion. Reform measures supported by the Administration and Congress would benefit more than 50 million Americans include: provide a flat 50% match on deposits into qualified retirement accounts up to $1,000/$500 per year for joint/single filer, automatically deposit this match directly into a designated account through submission of IRS Form 8888, extend this benefit to households earning less than $65,000. An expanded Saver's Credit will build on the expansion of automatic enrollment in employer-sponsored accounts and employer innovation for automatic enrollment into IRAs to enable families to build a larger nest egg for their retirement and for other eligible uses.

Policy advocacy
The Savings for Working Families Act (SWFA) would make IDAs available to as many as 2.7 million low-income Americans. IDAs are matched savings accounts that help low-income families build appreciating assets and become financially self-reliant.
 Children’s Savings Accounts (CSAs) are financial products that seek to expand economic and educational opportunities for children by encouraging long‐term planning, building family wealth, and promoting financial literacy.
 Manufactured Housing Reform

Programs

Assets Learning Conference
CFED is well known for its Assets Learning Conference. The biennial conference brings together over a thousand leaders in the asset building field to discuss ways that assets can help create prosperity and expand economic opportunity for Americans.

Assets & Opportunity Network
CFED's national Assets & Opportunity Network is a movement-oriented group of advocates, practitioners, policymakers, and others nationwide working to expand the reach and deepen the impact of asset-based strategies. Network members are on the frontlines of state and local policy advocacy, coalition-building and service delivery. The purpose of this Network is to serve as both a learning community and advocacy community – to both enhance member capacity to advocate and deliver asset services, and to foster growth of assets movement leading to opportunities at scale. The Network is a hub of action for local, state and federal policy advocacy as well as program implementation.

Assets & Opportunity Scorecard
The Assets & Opportunity Scorecard gives a comprehensive look at Americans' financial security and assesses all states on their relative ability to provide opportunities for residents to build and retain assets. It assesses the 50 states and the District of Columbia on 135 outcome and policy measures, which describe how well residents are faring and what states can do to help them build and protect assets. These measures are grouped into five issue areas: Financial Assets & Income, Businesses & Jobs, Housing & Homeownership, Health Care, and Education.

Assets & Opportunity Local Data Center
The Assets & Opportunity Local Data Center is a resource for local-level household financial security data and information, including estimates of household wealth and financial access for thousands of cities and counties in America as well as more in-depth data profiles for a growing number of cities.

References

External links

Political and economic think tanks in the United States
Organizations established in 1979